Petter Gustafsson (born 16 September 1985) is a Swedish retired footballer who played as a defender.

He scored 13 goals for his former team Skellefteå FF as winger during the 2008 season, but can also play fullback which has been his primary position in recent years. Gustafsson signed for Djurgården on 19 February 2009. He made his Allsvenskan debut on 6 April 2009 against Örebro SK. Petter scored his first goal in Allsvenskan against Elfsborg on 24 October 2010.

Honours
2008 player of the year Swedish football Division 2 Västerbotten.

References

External links
 
 Eliteprospects profile
 Djurgårdens IF profile

1985 births
Living people
Swedish footballers
Allsvenskan players
Djurgårdens IF Fotboll players
People from Skellefteå Municipality
Skellefteå FF players
Åtvidabergs FF players
Association football wingers
Association football fullbacks
Sportspeople from Västerbotten County